Ramoty  is a village in the administrative district of Gmina Stary Targ, within Sztum County, Pomeranian Voivodeship, in northern Poland.

The village has a population of 100.

References

Villages in Sztum County